Kurenai no Tsubasa (lit. "Crimson Wings") is a 1958 black and white Japanese film directed by Kō Nakahira.

Plot
On Hachijojima island, a child suffers from tetanus and urgently needs serum delivered. The pilot Ishida Yasuji ends up flying a small Cessna after a larger airplane breaks down. Newspaper reporter Yukie and Ohashi, who originally chartered the Cessna, accompany him, but Ohashi, who has just killed a man, forces Ishida to land the plane on a small island along the way in an attempt to escape capture.

Cast 
 Yujiro Ishihara : Ishida Yasuji
 Izumi Ashikawa : Ishida Shinobu
 Hideaki Nitani : Ohashi Kazuo
 Masumi Okada : 
 Kō Nishimura : Mizutani Tetsuji
 Sanae Nakahara :
 Shinsuke Ashida : Sasaki
 Shirō Osaka
 Kyosuke Machida
 Hisano Yamaoka :
 Keiichirō Akagi : (extra)
 Toru Abe : Iwami Takeshi
 Masami Shimojō Sekine Junzō

References 

Japanese black-and-white films
1958 films
Films directed by Kō Nakahira
Japanese aviation films
Nikkatsu films
1950s Japanese films